Enantia jethys, the jethys mimic white or bold mimic white, is a butterfly in the  family Pieridae. It is found in Mexico and Guatemala.

References

Dismorphiinae
Butterflies described in 1836
Pieridae of South America
Taxa named by Jean Baptiste Boisduval